The following is a list of villages in the Luhansk Oblast of Ukraine, categorised by raion (district).

Alchevsk Raion 

 Bohdanivka
 Dovhe
 Krasnyi Lyman
 Molodizhne
 Novooleksandrivka
 Pryshyb
 Smile

Dovzhansk Raion 

 Bilenke
 Kalynivka

Luhansk Raion 

 Illiriia
 Kamianka
 Krasnyi Yar
 Metalist
 Mykolaivka
 Pankivka
 Verkhnia Krasnianka
 Vesela Hora
 Zhovte

Rovenky Raion 

 Zelenyi Hai

Shchastia Raion 

 Artema
 Chuhinka
 Krasna Talivka
 Kriakivka
 Krymske
 Lobacheve
 Lopaskyne
 Malynove
 Pobieda
 Staryi Aidar
 Syze
 Trokhizbenka

Sievierodonetsk Raion 

 Chervonopopivka
 Katerynivka
 Lysychanskyi
 Novozvanivka
 Orikhove
 Prychepylivka
 Shypylivka
 Sokilnyky
 Synetskyi
 Troitske
 Ustynivka
 Verkhnokamyanka
 Voevodivka
 Zatyshne
 Zholobok
 Zolotarivka

Starobilsk Raion 

 Berezove
 Lozove
 Rannia Zoria
 Sychanske

Svatove Raion 

 Hrekivka
 Makiivka
 Tymonove
 Zaitseve

Luhansk Oblast
Villages in Luhansk Oblast
Lists of villages in Ukraine